Brian Mustanski is an American psychologist noted for his research on the health of LGBT youth, HIV and substance use in young gay and bisexual men, and the use of new media and technology for sexual health promotion and HIV prevention.  He is a Professor of Medical Social Sciences, Psychiatry and Behavioral Sciences, and Psychology and Director of the Institute for Sexual and Gender Minority Health and Wellbeing at Northwestern University, Chicago, IL.

Education and career 
Mustanski completed his Doctor of Philosophy in clinical psychology at Indiana University in 2004. His dissertation was titled The relationship between mood and sexual interest, behavior, and risk-taking. His graduate training was supported by a National Science Foundation Graduate Research Fellowship. His doctoral advisor was Richard Viken. He trained in sex therapy and sexuality research at the Kinsey Institute.

Mustanski is a tenured Professor of Medical Social Sciences, Psychiatry and Behavioral Sciences, and Psychology at Northwestern University, Chicago, IL.  He is Director of the Institute for Sexual and Gender Minority Health and Wellbeing, Co-Director of the NIH funded Third Coast Center for AIDS Research (CFAR), and Co-Director of the Center for Prevention Implementation Methodology. His research focuses on the health and development of LGBTQ youth and the application of new media and technology to sexual health promotion and HIV prevention. He has been a Principal Investigator of NIH and foundation grants and has published over 270 journal articles in the areas of LGBTQ health, HIV/AIDS, mental health, and substance use.  Dr. Mustanski is a frequent advisor to federal agencies and other organizations on LGBTQ health needs and research priorities, including being an appointed member of the NIH National Advisory Council on Minority Health and Health Disparities and the NIH Council of Councils Sexual and Gender Minority Research Working Group.

Awards and honors 
Recognition for his work include being named a William T Grant Foundation Scholar, the Society for Prevention Research Award for Advances in Culture and Diversity in Prevention Science, and the Award for Distinguished Scientific Contribution from the Society for the Psychological Study of Lesbian, Gay, Bisexual, and Transgender Issues of the American Psychological Association.  In 2017, NBC News selected him as one of 30 changemakers and innovators making a positive difference in the LGBTQ community.  He was elected the 46th President of the International Academy of Sex Research in 2020.

See also 

 LGBT people in science

References 

Year of birth missing (living people)
Living people
Indiana University alumni
Northwestern University faculty
21st-century American psychologists
American clinical psychologists
American LGBT scientists
Gay academics
Gay scientists
21st-century LGBT people